Belogorsky District  is an administrative and municipal district (raion), one of the twenty in Amur Oblast, Russia. Its administrative center is the town of Belogorsk (which is not administratively a part of the district). Population:  23,848 (2002 Census);

Administrative and municipal status
Within the framework of administrative divisions, Belogorsky District is one of the twenty in the oblast. The town of Belogorsk serves as its administrative center, despite being incorporated separately as an urban okrug—an administrative unit with the status equal to that of the districts.

As a municipal division, the district is incorporated as Belogorsky Municipal District. Belogorsk Urban Okrug is incorporated separately from the district.

References

Sources

External links
 Map of District, from official website
 Map of District, Google Maps
 Map of District, OpenStreetMap

Districts of Amur Oblast
 
